Fernand Brunner (8 October 1920 – 1 November 1991) was a Swiss philosopher.  After studying in Lausanne and in Paris, became a professor at the University of Neuchâtel.

He united philosophical introspection with the study of the History of Philosophy in a personalized manner. He was interested in ancient history, the Middle Ages, the Modern era, traditional Arab and Jewish philosophies, as well as ideas from India, studying the differences between philosophy and tradition.  Among Western traditions, he was particularly interested in the platonic and neoplatonic traditions, in Meister Eckhart, in Solomon Ibn Gabirol, and in Leibniz.

He defended the idea that philosophy was linked to wisdom, and that the history of philosophy was strictly linked to philosophy itself.  In his work about science and reality, he criticized the foundations of modern science, which he countered with the importance of philosophy.

Works
Études sur la signification historique de la philosophie de Leibniz, Vrin, Paris, 1950
Ibn Gabirol, La source de vie, livre III, trad., Vrin, Paris, 1950
Science et réalité, Aubier, Paris, 1954
Platonisme et aristotélisme; La critique d'Ibn Gabirol par Saint Thomas d'Aquin, Nauwelaerts, Louvain, Paris, 1965
Maître Eckhart, Seghers, Paris, 1969
Introduction à la philosophie, Éditions du Grand Midi, Zurich, 1995

1920 births
1991 deaths
Academic staff of the University of Neuchâtel
20th-century Swiss philosophers